Samachar 24 is a Hindi-language 24/7 News television channel, owned by samachar24 news network. The channel is a free-to-air and launched on 4 April 2013. The channel is available across

References

Hindi-language television channels in India
Television channels and stations established in 2016
Hindi-language television stations
Mathura
Television stations in Uttar Pradesh
2013 establishments in Uttar Pradesh